Alfred Böhm (23 March 1920 - 22 September 1995) was an Austrian actor and director. He was the brother of fellow actors Franz Böheim and Carlo Böhm. He was known for directing the film Die Orchesterprobe (The Orchestra Rehearsal), and acting in Patient aus Leidenschaft (Patient With Passion) and Herr im Haus bin ich (I Am the Master of the House).

References

Further reading
 Ernst Bruckmüller (ed.): Personenlexikon Österreich. Wien: Verlagsgemeinschaft Österreich-Lexikon 2001
 Who is Who in Österreich mit Südtirolteil (Hübners "Blaues Who is Who"). Zug: Who is who, Verlag für Personalenzyklopädien 1995
 Isabella Ackerl / Friedrich Weissensteiner: Österreichisches Personenlexikon der Ersten und Zweiten Republik, Wien: Ueberreuter 1992
 Hans Weigel: "Alfred Böhm". In: Kurier, Beilage Freizeit, 17 March 1990
 Dolf Lindner (ed.): Mit besten Empfehlungen, Ihr Alfred Böhm. Erinnerungen & Anekdoten. St. Pölten / Wien: Verlag Niederösterreichisches Pressehaus 1988
 Dolf Lindner (ed.): "Alfred Böhm wird 70". In: Leben in Wien (1989), Heft 3, p. 20 ff.

1920 births
1995 deaths
Austrian actors